The Fuller ministry (1922–1925) or Second Fuller ministry was the 41st ministry of the New South Wales Government, and was led by the 22nd Premier, Sir George Fuller. This ministry was the second of two occasions where Fuller was Premier.

Fuller was first elected to the New South Wales Legislative Assembly in 1889, defeated in 1894, elected to the House of Representatives in 1901, defeated in 1914, and re-elected to the Assembly in 1917 and serving until 1928.  Fuller becoming leader of the Nationalist Party following the 1920 state election. The Speaker of the Legislative Assembly did not vote unless there was a tie which meant whichever side provided the speaker was unable to command a majority. Nationalist Daniel Levy controversially accepted re-election as speaker, giving Labor an effective majority.

James Dooley became Premier following the death of John Story. In December 1921 Fuller indicated to Levy that it was likely he could form a coalition with the Progressives and Levy resigned as speaker on 12 December 1921. Levy was replaced by Labor's Simon Hickey and the government was defeated on the floor of the house 44 votes to 45. The Dooley ministry resigned and as a result Fuller was asked by Governor Sir Walter Davidson to form a government. The coalition did not have complete support, with Nationalists William Ashford and William Bagnall reportedly dissatisfied, while formal coalition was opposed by the True Blue members of the Progressive party, led by Michael Bruxner and Ernest Buttenshaw. It is not clear who Fuller hoped would take the role of speaker, however when the Legislative Assembly resumed, Bagnall offered to accept the role of speaker. Rather than have Bagnall as speaker, Levy agreed to return to the role. Fuller sought an early election, which was refused and the ministry resigned, seven hours after it was commissioned.

Davidson commissioned Dooley to form a second ministry that lasted until the 1922 state election when Fuller was successful in defeating Dooley, with the Nationalists winning 41 seats, the Progressive Party 9 and Labor having 36 seats.

The ministry covers the period from 13 April 1922 until 17 June 1925 when Fuller was defeated by Labor's Jack Lang at the 1925 state election.

Composition of ministry
The composition of the ministry was announced by Premier Fuller on 13 April 1922.

 
Ministers are members of the Legislative Assembly unless otherwise noted.

See also

First Fuller ministry
Members of the New South Wales Legislative Assembly, 1922-1925
Members of the New South Wales Legislative Council, 1922-1925

References

 

New South Wales ministries
1922 establishments in Australia
1925 disestablishments in Australia